Kapitan Petko voyvoda is a village in the municipality of Topolovgrad, in Haskovo Province, in southern Bulgaria. Before 1925 was lived here about 800-900 Greeks.

References

Villages in Haskovo Province